Cobden/Bruce McPhail Memorial Airport  is located  southeast of Cobden, Ontario, Canada.

References

Registered aerodromes in Ontario
Transport in Renfrew County